Maple Leaf Sports & Entertainment Ltd. (MLSE) is a professional sports and commercial real estate company based in Toronto, Ontario, Canada. With assets that include franchises in four of the six major professional sports leagues in the United States and Canada, it is the largest sports and entertainment company in Canada, and one of the largest in North America.

The primary holdings of the company are its major sports franchises, the Toronto Maple Leafs of the National Hockey League, Toronto Raptors of the National Basketball Association, Toronto Argonauts of the Canadian Football League, and Toronto FC of Major League Soccer, as well as their minor league farm teams, the Toronto Marlies of the American Hockey League (AHL), Raptors 905 of the NBA G League and Toronto FC II of the MLS Next Pro, respectively.

In addition, it owns Scotiabank Arena (originally named Air Canada Centre), the home arena of the Maple Leafs and Raptors, and the OVO Athletic Centre (originally named BioSteel Centre), the practice facility for the Raptors. MLSE also manages or has invested in several other sports facilities including BMO Field, home of Toronto FC and the Toronto Argonauts; Coca-Cola Coliseum, home of the Marlies; Ford Performance Centre, the practice facility of the Maple Leafs and Marlies; BMO Training Ground practice facility for Toronto FC and home of Toronto FC II and the TFC Academy; and Lamport Stadium, practice facility for the Argonauts.

MLSE was founded by Conn Smythe in 1931 as Maple Leaf Gardens Limited (MLGL) to act as a holding company for the Maple Leafs and their planned new arena Maple Leaf Gardens, from which the company got its name. Smythe transferred his ownership of the Leafs to the company in exchange for shares in MLGL and sold shares in the holding company to the public to help fund construction of the arena. While initially primarily a hockey company, with ownership stakes in a number of minor and junior hockey clubs including the Toronto Marlboros of the Ontario Hockey Association, the company later branched out to own the Hamilton Tiger-Cats of the CFL from the late 1970s to late 1980s, before merging with the Raptors, who were constructing the Air Canada Centre at the time, and adopting their current name in 1998. The company launched Toronto FC in 2007. Most recently, the company completed its purchase of the Argonauts in January 2018.

Over most of its 80 plus years of existence MLSE was a public company. Following the death of majority owner Harold Ballard in 1990, Steve Stavro led a controversial bid to buy the company and take it private. In 2012, the Ontario Teachers' Pension Plan (OTPP) sold their 79.53% share of the company for  billion to a joint venture between Rogers Communications and BCE Inc., two of Canada's largest media companies, giving the company an equity value of  billion and an enterprise value of  billion.

Corporate history

Founding

The corporation's roots can be traced back to 1927, when Conn Smythe organized a group of investors to purchase Toronto's premier hockey franchise, the Toronto St. Patricks of the National Hockey League (NHL), which had won Stanley Cup championships in 1918 (as the Toronto Arenas) and 1922, from a group headed by Charles Querrie. The club was playing poorly and minority partner Jack Bickell contacted Smythe about becoming coach of the team.  However, Smythe told Bickell that he was more interested in buying a stake in the team. Not long after, with the team in trouble financially due to majority owner Querrie having lost a lawsuit to former Toronto Blueshirts owner Eddie Livingstone over ownership of the franchise, Querrie put the St. Pats up for sale and agreed in principle to sell them to C. C. Pyle for $200,000, who planned to move the team to Philadelphia. After Bickell contacted Smythe to inform him of the sale, Smythe persuaded Querrie that civic pride was more important than money and put together a syndicate that bought the St. Pats. Smythe himself invested $10,000 of his own money and his group contributed $75,000 up front and a further $75,000 due 30 days later, with Bickell retaining his $40,000 share in the team.  The deal was finalized on Valentine's Day, and the new owners quickly renamed the team the Toronto Maple Leafs, after the national symbol of Canada. Smythe attributed his choice of a maple Leaf for the logo to his experiences as a Canadian Army officer and prisoner of war during World War I.  Later that year, Smythe bought the junior hockey Toronto Marlboros of the Ontario Hockey Association to serve as a developmental team for Maple Leafs.

In 1929 Smythe decided, in the midst of the Great Depression, that the Maple Leafs needed a new arena. The Arena Gardens, their then home which they shared with the Marlboros, had been built in 1912 and lacked modern amenities.  It seated just 8,000, which the Maple Leafs were regularly filling. After considering various locations, the site at the corner of Carlton and Church was purchased from The T. Eaton Co. Ltd. for $350,000, a price said to be $150,000 below market value. A new 12,473 seat (14,550 including standing room) arena, Maple Leaf Gardens (MLG), was designed by the architectural firm of Ross and Macdonald. To finance construction, Smythe got backing from Sun Life for half of the expected $1 million cost. He then formed Maple Leaf Gardens Limited (MLGL) as a management company that would own both the hockey team and the arena. A public offering of shares in MLGL was made at $10 each ($ in  dollars), with a free common share for each five preferred shares purchased. Ownership of the hockey team was transferred to MLGL in return for shares. To fund construction of the building, workers were paid 20% of their salary in MLG stock. Construction started on June 1, 1931, and MLG was opened five months and two weeks later, on November 12, 1931, at a cost of $1.5 million ($ in  dollars). The Marlboros also moved to the new arena.  Bickell was named the first president of MLG.

To help fill dates at the new arena, Smythe acquired an expansion franchise in the professional International Lacrosse League on behalf of MLGL for the 1932 season, which was also given the name the Toronto Maple Leafs. A team named the Toronto Maple Leafs had competed in the first season of the ILL at the Arena Gardens, but was renamed the Tecumsehs with the arrival of Smythe's team. Both teams played at MLG. Smythe pulled out following the season due to financial losses, and the league did not play the following year.

Minor hockey expansion
The company has owned numerous minor league hockey teams over the years, which have served as developmental farm teams for the Maple Leafs. A group backed by Smythe and Frank Selke of the Montreal Canadiens was awarded an American Hockey League (AHL) franchise for Rochester, New York in July 1956, after a local group could not come up with the US$150,000 in capital required by the league. The Leafs and Canadiens would each own 27.5% of the team, with the balance sold to Rochester interests.  The team was named the Rochester Americans.  The Amerks were a joint affiliate of both the Canadiens and the Maple Leafs, though the club was operated by the Canadiens. In the summer of 1959 the Maple Leafs bought out the Canadiens' ownership share of the club, giving them a 55% controlling interest, due to concerns that with Montreal operating the club they were giving their prospects priority over those of the Leafs.  They purchased most of the remaining 45% in 1963, boosting their ownership share to 98% by November 1964. In July 1966 the Maple Leafs sold the team to a group which included their then General Manager Punch Imlach for a reported $400,000.

In June 1963 the Spokane Comets Western Hockey League franchise was purchased by a group led by the Maple Leafs, who relocated them to become the Denver Invaders and act as the Leaf's farm team. Though the league did not acknowledge that the Maple Leafs had an ownership stake in the team, they held a majority position with the Denver partners only owning roughly 36%. Following reported losses of $150,000 in their first season, Smythe announced that the team would be relocated after the team failed to reach a 2,000 season ticket target by a league-imposed deadline. The team became the Victoria Maple Leafs for the following season. In June 1967 MLGL sold the team for $500,000 to a group from Phoenix, which relocated it to become the Phoenix Roadrunners.

In 1964 MLGL the Tulsa Oilers of the Central Professional Hockey League were launched. The team was owned and operated by MLGL as a developmental club for the Maple Leafs. In the spring of 1973 it was announced that the Oilers would relocate to become the Oklahoma City Blazers.  Prior to the 1976–77 season the Maple Leafs decided to share an affiliate with the Chicago Black Hawks in an attempt to reduce costs, and pulled out of the Blazers.  In 1978 the New Brunswick Hawks of the AHL were established, and were jointly operated by the Chicago Black Hawks and the Toronto Maple Leafs as their farm team.  MLGL and the Black Hawks each owned half of the franchise.  However, by 1980 MLGL had decided that the Leafs needed a team of their own, with a spokesperson citing the limited number of roster spots as the rationale for the move.  In 1981 the Cincinnati Tigers of the old Central Hockey League were established under the ownership of MLGL, but the team averaged only 1,500 fans and lost $750,000 in their first season and folded the following spring.  Shortly thereafter, with Chicago having pulled out of New Brunswick in favour of affiliating with the Springfield Indians on their own, the Leafs relocated the New Brunswick Hawks to St. Catharines, Ontario to establish the St. Catharines Saints as their farm team.  The team played in St. Catharines until 1986, and after stops in Newmarket, Ontario as the Newmarket Saints (1986–1991) and St. John's, Newfoundland and Labrador as the St. John's Maple Leafs (1991–2005), the team moved to Toronto as the Toronto Marlies (named after the company's former junior team) where they have been playing ever since.

The Toronto Marlboros served as a junior farm team for the Maple Leafs for 40 years until direct NHL sponsorship of junior clubs ended in 1967 when the NHL made the Entry Draft universal.  In October 1988, with the team losing hundreds of thousands of dollars a year, MLGL reached an agreement to sell the Marlboros for a reported $500,000, severing their ties with the Maple Leafs. However, the Leafs retained the rights to the Marlies name.  The OHL team moved to Hamilton for the 1989–90 season, becoming the Dukes of Hamilton.

Growth beyond hockey

In 1967 MLGL entered into negotiations to purchase the financially struggling Toronto Maple Leafs baseball team of the minor AAA International League. The asking price was $60,000. The deal ultimately fell apart due to concerns about the team's stadium, Maple Leaf Stadium, which needed up to $250,000 in repairs and whose owner wanted $4 million to purchase it, and the team was sold and relocated to become the Louisville Colonels for the following season.  MLGL owner Harold Ballard said that the company's interest was due in part to help position itself to go after a Major League Baseball (MLB) franchise for Toronto.   In early 1974 MLGL announced plans to build a new baseball stadium in Toronto, but the city ultimately decided to renovate Exhibition Stadium to make it suitable for baseball.  At the time, the MLGL group, led by Lorne Duguid, vice-president of Hiram Walker Distillers and MLGL executive, was one of at least four bidding for a Toronto MLB team, including competing groups led by Labatt Brewing Company, Robert Hunter, the former President of the International League Maple Leafs, and Canadian Baseball Co, led by Sydney Cooper.  After negotiating with the owners of the Baltimore Orioles, Chicago White Sox, Cleveland Indians and Oakland Athletics in their attempt to acquire a team for Toronto, MLGL offered $15 million for the San Francisco Giants but the team's owner decided in early 1976 to sell the club to the Labatt group for US$13.25 million.  While the Giants' relocation was ultimately rejected by a U.S. court, Labatt was awarded an expansion team in the American League that became the Toronto Blue Jays for US$7 million later that year.

A team named the Toronto Maple Leafs competed in the inaugural season of the National Lacrosse Association, a professional box lacrosse league, in 1968 at MLG. MLGL owners Ballard and Stafford Smythe were two of the five founding partners of the club, but financial difficulties forced MLGL to take over ownership midway through the season. The NLA suspended operations prior to the following season.

In the early 1970s MLGL announced plans to apply for a second Toronto-based Canadian Football League team, in addition to the Toronto Argonauts, which would play at Varsity Stadium, but the proposal never went anywhere.  In 1974, when his former partner John Bassett put the Argonauts up for sale for $3.3 million, Ballard expressed interest in buying the team, but it was ultimately sold to William R. Hodgson.  Shortly thereafter Ballard tried to buy the Hamilton Tiger-Cats of the CFL from owner Michael DeGroote, but this offer was also rejected. Three money-losing seasons later, in February 1978, DeGroote sold the team to MLGL for $1.3 million.  During his tenure as owner of the Tiger-Cats, Ballard repeatedly threatened to move the franchise to Toronto's Varsity Stadium, which was vetoed by the Argos, and claimed to have lost roughly $20 million over 11 seasons.   MLGL sold the team in March 1989 to David Braley for $2.

Ruby Richman, the former coach of Canada men's national basketball team, working with Ballard pursued a number of existing National Basketball Association (NBA) and American Basketball Association (ABA) teams to relocate to Toronto to play at MLG in the 1970s. Richman had a tentative agreement to purchase both the Miami Floridians and Pittsburgh Condors of the ABA with a plan to merge them into a single Toronto-based team, but the deal fell through. Later, Richman held negotiations with the Detroit Pistons, which were seeking $5 million for the franchise, but pulled out when the price was raised to $8.25 million.  MLGL attempted to purchase and relocate the Buffalo Braves, which had played a number of regular season games at MLG over the years, to Toronto in 1974 for $8.5 million, and again several times later, but the owners eventually chose to move the team to San Diego.  When Toronto was awarded an expansion NBA franchise in 1974 for the 1975–76 season MLGL was one of three groups to bid for the rights to the team, but the club never materialized as no group was able to secure funding for the expansion fee of $6.8 million. MLGL attempted to purchase and relocate the Houston Rockets in 1975, which were seeking $8 million for the team, but the team's lease ultimately prevented a relocation. In 1976 MLGL attempted to buy the Atlanta Hawks. In 1979 a Toronto group which included Ballard again pushed for an expansion franchise, but lost out to the Dallas Mavericks.  A Toronto group, which included Bill Ballard, son of Harold, and Basketball Hall of Famer Wilt Chamberlain submitted an application and US$100,000 deposit for an NBA expansion franchise for MLG in 1986, but of the six cities to apply Toronto was not one of the four which were successful. It was not until the NBA awarded an expansion franchise to John Bitove, over a group led by future MLSE minority owner Larry Tanenbaum which was supported MLGL, that the city would get an NBA team, with the Toronto Raptors joining the NBA for the 1995–96 season.

Merger with the Raptors and rebranding
In 1997 it was reported that the Maple Leafs were in negotiations to purchase the Toronto Shooting Stars of the National Professional Soccer League.  The team had been suspended following their inaugural season playing at MLG during which the club lost nearly $1 million and the league was forced to take over operations after only three games when ownership pulled out.  However, the team never returned to play.  Following the inaugural season of the Hamilton, Ontario-based Ontario Raiders of the National Lacrosse League in 1998, in which they lost $250,000 playing at Copps Coliseum, owner Chris Fritz was forced to look for partners.  MLSE engaged in negotiations to purchase the team and have it play at MLG.  However, a group which included Bill Watters, the then Assistant General Manager of the Toronto Maple Leafs, ultimately bought the team for $250,000 and promptly moved it to MLG where they rebranded the team the Toronto Rock.  MLSE held negotiations with the Arena Football League in 1998 on acquiring a US$4–7 million expansion franchise for the following season to coincide with the opening of the ACC.  The company also submitted an application for a Women's National Basketball Association franchise, but was rejected by the league due to concerns about their readiness.

With MLG aging, MLGL began planning for a new home arena for the Maple Leafs in the 1990s.  At the time, the Raptors were constructing a new arena, later to be called  Scotiabank Arena, which they invited the Maple Leafs to be a joint tenant at.  However, MLGL reject the offer, arguing that "the footprint is too small".  When Allan Slaight took over controlling ownership of the Toronto Raptors in late 1996, talks began again between the two groups.  MLGL put forward a proposal to the city to construct a new $300 million shared arena just to the north, on top of the rail tracks Union Station, with the already under construction Raptors arena being converted to a bus terminal.  However, the proposal died when an agreement could not reached with the City of Toronto government on rent for the land.  In November 1997 MLSE submitted a new proposal for a $250 million arena at Exhibition Place.  However, after years of acrimonious negotiations MLGL purchased 100% of the Raptors basketball club and the ACC, from Allan Slaight and the Bank of Nova Scotia on February 12, 1998.  MLGL paid a reported $467 million, made up of $179 million for the team and $288 million for the arena. Richard Peddie, who had been President of the Toronto Raptors, was retained in the merger and became MLSE's President and CEO.  That July the company adopted a new name, Maple Leaf Sports & Entertainment (MLSE), to reflect its broader holdings.  MLSE subsequently ordered major modifications to the original design of the ACC, which was basketball-specific, to make it more suitable for hockey.  Originally planned to cost $217 million, the budget was increased to $265 million after MLSE took control.  In February 1999 the company opened the ACC as the new home to the Leafs and Raptors.  MLG, which was left with no major tenants, was sold in 2004 for $12 million to Loblaw Companies, Canada's largest food retailer, which converted the ground level into one of its Loblaws franchises.  A condition of the sale was that it was not to be used as a sports and entertainment facility, though MLSE eventually consented to allowing a small arena to be restored in the building to house Ryerson University's Ryerson Rams (now Toronto Metropolitan University's TMU Bold).

The Canadian Radio-television and Telecommunications Commission (CRTC) granted MLSE two category 2 digital specialty channel licenses in 2000 for Leafs TV and Raptors NBA TV, which launched on September 7, 2001.  The channels were used by MLSE to broadcast live games involving their teams in an attempt to increase competition for their rights and drive up the fees paid by other broadcasters.

In August 2004 MLSE announced that they would relocate their AHL farm team from St. John's, Newfoundland to Toronto to play in Ricoh Coliseum (later renamed Coca-Cola Coliseum) for the 2005–06 season, after the arena was left without a hockey tenant following the termination of their lease with the Toronto Roadrunners, the AHL affiliate of the Edmonton Oilers, for defaulting on their rent.  MLSE agreed to a 20-year lease for the Coliseum, which had undergone a $38 million renovation in 2003, that called for rent to cover debt financing charges, property taxes and generate a return to the arena investors, which exceeds $4 million annually.

MLSE announced in April 2005 that they would be working with Cadillac Fairview (a wholly owned subsidiary of Ontario Teachers' Pension Plan) and Lanterra Developments to build Maple Leaf Square, a major entertainment complex situated next to the ACC. The $500 million  complex, which was completed in 2010, is a mixed use facility which features the Hotel St. Germain, e11ven restaurant, Real Sports Apparel, Real Sports Bar and Grill, Longo's grocery store, office space and condominium residences.  In conjunction with the construction of Maple Leaf Square was a two-year, $48 million renovation of the ACC to connect it with the square, which added a new atrium that includes a high-definition broadcast studio for Leafs TV, NBA TV Canada and GolTV Canada.  The external wall of the atrium features a 30 by  video screen which often broadcasts games to spectators gathered in the plaza in front of the arena.

Further expansion

MLSE was awarded a Major League Soccer expansion team for Toronto, which would become known as Toronto FC, in 2005 for US$10 million.  The company also agreed to contribute $8 million towards the construction of Toronto FC's future home BMO Field, which was to cost $62.9 million total, and purchased the naming rights to the stadium for $10 million for 20 years, which they subsequently resold to the Bank of Montreal for $27 million over the first 10 years.  MLSE also agreed to cover any construction cost overruns. The governments of Canada, Ontario and Toronto contributed $27 million, $8 million and $9.8 million respectively, with the City of Toronto also providing the land.  In return, MLSE got the management rights for the stadium for 20 years.  Prior to the 2010 MLS season, MLSE spent $3.5 million to convert the stadium from FieldTurf to natural grass, and a further $2 million to expand the north end by 1,400 seats. As part of the deal to convert the field to natural grass, MLSE spent $1.2 million adding a winter bubble to Lamport Stadium and $800,000 building a new artificial turf field to replace the community use hours lost at BMO Field.  The company manages the operations of the facility during the winter season, when the field is covered by the dome and community soccer programs are held.

MLSE partnered with Rogers Communications in 2005 to bid to host a regular season National Football League game in Toronto.  On January 30, 2008 it was announced that Rogers and Larry Tanenbaum, chairman of MLSE, had reached an agreement with the Buffalo Bills to host an annual regular-season and three exhibition NFL games over five seasons at Toronto's Rogers Centre beginning in 2008, with the games branded the Bills Toronto Series. At the time MLSE was considering bringing an NFL team to Toronto permanently and building them a new stadium, but abandoned the idea when they concluded that the project would not generate sufficient financial return to justify the significant cost of the project. Subsequently, MLSE president Tim Leiweke said on an NFL team in Toronto: "We can't own a team (per NFL rules), but we do have more expertise on how to build (stadiums) than anyone ... MLSE can play a role." It has been reported that MLSE is interested in building and managing the proposed NFL stadium, which it has already begun designing.  In 2013 MLSE minority owner Tanenbaum and board member Edward Rogers III partnered with musician Jon Bon Jovi to purchase an NFL team.  Following the death of Bills' owner Ralph Wilson in 2014 the group submitted an offer to purchase the franchise, with speculation that they would move the team to Toronto when their lease permitted it, but were outbid by the Pegulas.

Before MLSE completed its purchase of the Argonauts of the CFL in early 2018, the company contemplated purchasing the team at least twice, with minority partner Tanenbaum keen to add the team to his list of franchises, but concluded that the cost and effort that would be required to make the team profitable was not worth the minimal financial upside.  In 2013, it was reported that the company was again considering purchasing the team and having them play at a renovated BMO Field, with the asking price reportedly $20 million, but later coming down to $10 million.  A vote by MLSE's board on purchasing the team was called in December 2013, but they were unable to come to an agreement on the issue.  On May 20, 2015 it was announced that two of the three ownership partners of MLSE, Bell Canada and Tanenbaum's Kilmer Group, had acquired ownership of the Argos, with the deal to close at the end of the year, and would move the team to BMO Field for the 2016 season. It has been speculated that Rogers was not interested in investing in the team since Bell has exclusive rights to broadcast all CFL games. MLSE eventually completed its purchase the Argos in January 2018. According to the National Post, the sale, which came less than a month after the team won the 2017 Grey Cup, "is expected to help the Argos, given MLSE's financial scale and promotional, ticketing and operational advantages."  Additionally, it is thought that control of the Argos by MLSE will enhance Toronto's chances of acquiring an NFL franchise, with Peddie saying "the NFL is telling them that if you want an NFL team, you better make sure the Argos are okay."  Leiweke has said that moving into a renovated BMO field "will help turn [the Argos] around" and that "there's no way the NFL comes here without the CFL being unbelievably successful first." Upon completion of the sale, MLSE now owns four of the five major league sports teams in Toronto (only the Blue Jays are not owned by MLSE, although Rogers Communications, which owns the Blue Jays, has an ownership stake in MLSE).

When the nearby city of Oshawa built a new arena, known as General Motors Centre, MLSE was chosen to manage the building.  However, disappointing results in the first year and a half of operations following the arena's opening in November 2006 led MLSE to request that its contract be terminated in March 2008. The company had been attempting to get into the business of managing facilities beyond those where their teams play but decided to withdraw, with Bob Hunter, MLSE's Vice President of venues and entertainment, saying that managing the arena was "no longer a strategic focus for us".

Recent projects

In 2008 MLSE launched the TFC Academy youth system to develop soccer players for Toronto FC by taking advantage of MLS's new homegrown player rule which allows clubs to retain the rights to players they develop without them being subject to the MLS SuperDraft. The senior academy team originally competed in the Canadian Soccer League until pulling out in early 2013 due to the CSL losing its sanctioning from the Canadian Soccer Association.  The team played that year in the Ontario Soccer League before joining League1 Ontario for the 2014 season.  In September 2018, the U20 team left L1O and transformed into a U19 team that competes in the U.S. Soccer Development Academy (USSDA), along with U17 and U15 teams. The USSA announced on April 15, 2020 that they were ceasing operations permanently due to financial struggles brought on by the COVID-19 pandemic.  In response, MLS announced that it was creating MLS Next as a replacement elite youth player development development platform, which the Toronto FC Academy would participate in.

In November 2014 MLSE announced the establishment of Toronto FC II, their own minor league professional soccer team playing in the United Soccer League (now known as the USL Championship) and serving as a reserve team for TFC and a bridge between the Academy.  The team began play in 2015 at a newly renovated 2,000 seat stadium, with plans to expand it to 5,000 by 2017, constructed at the Ontario Soccer Centre in Vaughan, just north of Toronto.  However, after the expansion did not materialize, which was required to meet the 5,000 seat minimum requirement set by the United States Soccer Federation for the USL to be sanctioned as a division 2 league, the club announced that it would move its home games to BMO Field and Lamport Stadium beginning with the 2018 season.  On July 2, 2018 the club announced they would move to USL League One for the league's first season in 2019.  The club joined the MLS Next Pro league for its first season in 2022, moving their home games to York Lions Stadium.

In March 2011 Downsview Park was selected as the site of Toronto FC's new state-of-the-art academy and training facility. Construction began on the BMO Training Ground in May 2011, and the facility opened in June 2012.  It includes three grass fields, one domed turf field and a field house. MLSE spent more than $21 million building the facility and pays rent for the land,  In July 2014 it was announced that MLSE would expand the training grounds to house a practice facility for the Argos, which would rent the facility from MLSE and practice on a nearby city owned field.  The team moved in that September, but later moved their practice facility to Lamport Stadium in 2018.

Then Raptors President and General Manager Bryan Colangelo said in 2008 that MLSE was considering launching an NBA Development League franchise in the Toronto area within a couple of years to serve as a developmental team for the Raptors. Hamilton's Copps Coliseum and Oshawa were reportedly under consideration to host the franchise. However, a Canadian-based franchise posed difficulties due to tax and visa complications, and Rochester, New York, which is just across the United States border, was considered as an alternative.  In May 2015 it was announced that MLSE had purchased a D-League franchise, which would be named Raptors 905 and would begin play that fall at the Hershey Centre in Mississauga, a suburb of Toronto. The franchise reportedly cost $6 million.

It was announced on January 23, 2009 that MLSE would acquire the 80.1% interest in GolTV Canada, a digital cable soccer channel, held by MLSE owner Tanenbaum through Insight Sports.  The channel operated as a localized version of GOL TV USA, which owned the remaining 19.9%, with focus on Toronto FC.  MLSE informed the CRTC in 2015 that it had acquired full ownership of the channel, however later that year they announced that it would cease operations and the license be abandoned, effective August 31, 2015.  In November 2009 MLSE applied to the CRTC for a Category 2 digital TV license for a general interest sports service provisionally named Mainstream Sports, which was granted in June 2010. MLSE planned to broadcast its teams' games on the channel, along the lines of team-owned regional sports networks in the United States such as YES Network and the New England Sports Network, with the tentative name "Real Sports" (in keeping with the branding of MLSE's sports bar and apparel store). It was never revealed whether the channel would have replaced, or supplemented, MLSE's existing digital channels.  Peddie credited the threat of a Real Sports channel as a motivator for Rogers and Bell, owners of sports channels Sportsnet and TSN respectively, to purchase the company due to concerns about losing the rights to broadcast MLSE teams to the channel or having to pay huge fees for them. The acquisition of MLSE by Rogers and Bell in 2012, and associated agreements to divide the company's regional broadcast rights between the two, eliminated the need for the channel and its license expired after the three-year deadline for launch passed in 2013.

In September 2009 the Maple Leafs and Marlies opened their new hockey practice facility, the MasterCard Centre (later renamed the Ford Performance Centre). The arena was a joint venture between MLSE, the City of Toronto and the Lakeshore Lions Club to replace the nearby Lakeshore Lions Arena, and was built at a cost of $44 million, after cost overruns drove up the cost from $33.65 million.  The Lions Club contributed $40 million to the project, with the city providing a $35.5 million loan guarantee.  The Toronto District School Board leased the land for the arena to the Lakeshore Lions for a 50-year term. MLSE spent a further $5 million on training and medical facilities, and pays $600,000 annually to rent the building.  The arena was originally operated by the Lakeshore Lions Club, but in June 2011, with the arena on the verge of defaulting on its rising debt, the City of Toronto took control and assumed its $43.4 million debt with the intention to return it to private management within 2–3 years.  A city councillor has suggested that MLSE, which operates BMO Field and Coca-Cola Coliseum on behalf of the city, would be "the logical party" to take over the arena, and a spokesperson for the company said "while we don't have any interest in purchasing the facility, we are open to discussing the possibility of managing the facility on behalf of the City". MLSE's executive vice president of venues and entertainment Bob Hunter confirmed that they would bid for the right to run the building.

At one point MLSE contemplated purchasing the Toronto Blue Jays of MLB and Sportsnet from Rogers Communications, but concerns about the viability of Rogers Centre as a baseball venue and the profitability of the team resulted in the company not pursuing either. The company also considered investing in an English soccer club, and in May 2012, after the Leeds United Supporters Trust put out a request for a takeover from majority shareholder Ken Bates, it was reported that MLSE were in talks to buy the Football League Championship team. However, the company later denied that it planned to purchase the club. In 2015 reports emerged that MLSE was investigating taking over the bankrupt Parma F.C. of Italy's Serie A.

Peddie retired as President and CEO of MLSE at the end of 2011 after 14 years on the job, having tripled the value of the company. However, he was often criticized for his inability to end the company's long championship drought.  The Leafs haven't won a championship since 1967, and at the time the only other major championship won under MLSE ownership was the 74th Grey Cup in 1986 by the Tiger-Cats.  Toronto FC subsequently won in 2017, as did the Raptors in 2019.  (The Argonauts' 2017 Grey Cup win came shortly before MLSE announced its purchase of the team.) Though Tom Anselmi briefly took over as President, he was replaced in June 2013 by high-profile executive Tim Leiweke, who had previously run Anschutz Entertainment Group.  On August 21, 2014 Leiweke announced that he was stepping down, but would remain in his position until a successor was appointed.  MLSE announced on October 29, 2015 that Michael Friisdahl had been hired as Leiweke's successor as President and CEO, and would officially assume his duties in December 2015.

The financial success of Toronto FC led MLSE to undertake a major renovation of BMO Field.  Under a two phase process, the stadium's capacity was increased from 21,566 to 30,000 by May 2015, and a canopy roof covering most permanent seating areas was added and the pitch lengthened to accommodate a Canadian football field by May 2016. The renovations were originally budgeted to cost $120 million, but ended up at $150 million in total. In exchange for a $10 million contribution to the project by the City of Toronto, which owns the stadium, they receive rent from MLSE, while MLSE's management and naming rights agreements for the stadium, which were set to expire in 2027, were extended by 10 years. The province of Ontario also contributed $10 million to the financing.  The City insisted that the renovations allow the Argonauts, who had to vacate their current home the Rogers Centre, to move in.  The sale of the Argos in May 2015 to a new ownership group consisting of MLSE owners Bell and Tanenbaum was accompanied by an announcement that they had reached an agreement with MLSE to relocate to the stadium for the 2016 season. The Argos contributed $10 million to the conversion of the field to make it CFL compatible, which was matched by MLSE. MLSE financed the rest of the project, and was responsible for cost overruns.  The renovated stadium can be temporarily expanded to a capacity of roughly 40,000 for big events. The Argos purchase agreement called for two Grey Cups to be played at BMO Field, the first being the 104th Grey Cup in 2016, and the stadium was chosen to host rugby sevens at the 2015 Pan Am Games and the 2017 NHL Centennial Classic.

In August 2014, MLSE reached an agreement with the City of Toronto to build a practice facility for the Raptors at Exhibition Place. MLSE paid the $30 million construction cost, and leases the property from the city for $205,000 annually, subject to reassessments for inflation, for a 20-year term, with two options to extend it by a further 10 years, following which the city would take ownership of the building.  Construction was completed in time for the team's hosting of the NBA All-Star Game in February 2016. Originally known as the Biosteel Centre, in March 2019, the Raptors reached an agreement with OVO on a naming rights deal to brand the facility as the OVO Athletic Centre.

In February 2015, MLSE confirmed that they were planning on launching a professional boxing series, featuring 3-4 major fights a year co-promoted with Groupe Yvon Michel. Originally planned to start with a World Boxing Council (WBC) light heavyweight title fight in April at Ricoh Coliseum, this was delayed due to regulatory restrictions on the amount of gauze that can be used for wrist wraps in Ontario.  MLSE and Michel joined with Lennox Lewis to promote a WBC light-heavyweight title fight in September 2015 at Ricoh Coliseum.

In August 2017 MLSE announced that it had reached an agreement with Scotiabank to rename the ACC Scotiabank Arena, effective July 1, 2018, for a reported CAD $800 million over 20 years, which would make it the largest such deal in North American sports history.

MLSE announced in December 2017 that it had agreed to purchase the Toronto Argonauts of the Canadian Football League outright, with the deal finalized on January 19, 2018.

In May 2022, Tanenbaum indicated that MLSE was exploring opportunities for professional women's sports teams in hockey, basketball, and soccer for Toronto.

In August 2022 it was announced that Leafs Nation Network, the rebranded Leafs TV speciality channel devoted to the Maple Leafs and Marlies, would cease operations on September 1.  The channel had been valued at $19 million on behalf of the CRTC in 2012.

Timeline of sports franchise ownership

Ownership

Conn Smythe

Although Conn Smythe was the face of MLGL from its founding in 1931, he did not acquire majority ownership of the company until 1947, following a power struggle between directors who supported him as president and those who wanted him replaced with Frank J. Selke. With the help of a $300,000 loan from Toronto stockbroker and MLGL shareholder Percy Gardiner, and the support of minority partner Jack Bickell, Smythe was able to buy 30,000 shares in MLGL from Gardiner and installed himself as president on November 19, 1947, replacing Edward Bickle.  The loan was paid off in 1960.  In November 1961, Smythe sold 45,000 of his 50,000 shares to a three-person partnership formed by his son Stafford Smythe, Harold Ballard, and John Bassett (owner of the Toronto Telegram and part-owner of the Canadian Football League's Toronto Argonauts) for $2.3 million.  When combined with their own holdings, this gave the Stafford-Ballard-Bassett partnership 87,000 shares, representing 60% of the company. Ballard fronted Stafford most of the money for the purchase though a loan he obtained.  According to several sources, Conn thought the sale was only to his son, and was furious when he learned that Ballard and Bassett were his partners. He had hoped that Stafford would keep MLGL for his son, Tommy. However, it is unlikely that Stafford could have raised the millions needed for the deal on his own. Stafford became president of MLGL and governor of the Maple Leafs, with Ballard becoming executive vice president and Bassett chairman of the board.

Harold Ballard, John Bassett, and Stafford Smythe
In March 1966, Conn sold his remaining MLGL shares and resigned from the board of directors after a Muhammad Ali boxing match was scheduled for MLG. He found Ali's refusal to serve in the U.S. Army during the Vietnam War to be offensive, and said that by accepting the fight, MLGL owners had "put cash ahead of class."  Within three years under the new owners, profits had tripled to just under $1 million. Ballard negotiated lucrative deals to place advertising throughout the building, and greatly increased the number of seats in the arena.

Following a Royal Canadian Mounted Police raid at MLG in 1968, Stafford was charged with income tax evasion, and he and Ballard were accused of illegally taking money from MLGL to pay for home renovations and other personal expenses. Just before the charges were laid, Bassett argued to the board of directors that Stafford and Ballard should be removed from their posts. On June 26, 1969, following an 8–7 vote of the board, Stafford and Ballard were both fired, and Bassett was appointed president of MLGL. However, Bassett did not force Stafford and Ballard to sell their shares, and both men remained on the board.  This proved to be a serious strategic blunder; Stafford was the largest single shareholder in MLGL, and he and Ballard controlled almost half the company's stock between them.  They were thus able to regain control of the board in 1970, and Stafford was once again appointed president.  Facing an untenable situation, Bassett sold the 196,200 MLGL shares he controlled to Stafford and Ballard in September 1971 for $5.4 million, which he used to buy out his partners in the Argonauts. Combined with their 306,295 jointly controlled shares, the transaction gave the Stafford-Ballard partnership 78% of the stock.  Stafford died in October 1971 of a bleeding ulcer at only 50 years of age, just before his trial was scheduled to begin. Under the terms of Stafford's will, of which Ballard was an executor, each partner was allowed to buy the other's shares upon their death. Stafford's brother and son tried to keep the shares within the family, but in February 1972 Ballard bought all 251,545 of Stafford's shares for $7.5 million, valuing the company at $22 million. Stafford's brother Hugh also sold his shares to Ballard, ending the Smythe family's 45-year involvement in the company. Combined with Ballard's 262,162 shares, this gave him majority ownership of about 70%.  Six months later, Ballard was convicted of 47 charges, including fraud and theft of money and goods, and sentenced to three years in a federal penitentiary.

Harold Ballard
In 1966, Ballard set up a family holding company named Harold E. Ballard Ltd. (HEBL) for his assets, including his shares in MLGL, as part of an estate freeze. Ballard distributed 103 common shares in HEBL, with his three children (Bill, Harold Jr., and Mary Elizabeth) each receiving 34 which were held in trust, and his wife Dorothy receiving 1, which Harold would inherit upon her death three years later. Harold retained 308,000 preferred shares in HEBL.  While the equity of the company was vested in the common stock, both common and preferred shares each received a single vote, ensuring that Harold retained control of the company.

After getting into financial difficulty, Ballard reached an agreement in November 1980 with Molson Brewery (who at the time owned the Montreal Canadiens) for the company to cover his debt financing charges on a loan of $8.8 million for 10 years in exchange for an option to purchase a 19.9% block of shares in MLGL from HEBL and a right of first refusal on the rest of HEBL's shares.  The NHL did not learn of the deal until the late 1980s. In 1982, he offered to sell the company for $50 million, with the arena alone reportedly valued at $11 million, though a stockholders' report the following year placed the value of MLGL at $23.5 million. When Harold transferred ownership of his personal real estate holdings, which were valued at $2.52 million, to HEBL in January 1989, he acquired 4 newly issued common shares in the company plus a promise of a further $896,472 rather than cash. Mary Elizabeth sold her stake in HEBL to her father for $15.5 million in January 1989, after originally having a deal to sell the stake to Don Giffin, while Harold Jr. sold his back to HEBL for $21 million in June of the same year. Harold secured a loan from Molson for the full amount of his buyout of Mary Elizabeth, using the 34 acquired shares in HEBL as security. Harold Jr.'s shares were subsequently retired. Bill sued his father for $170 million over HEBL's acquisition of Harold Jr.'s stake, claiming that he and partner Michael Cohl had acquired a right of first refusal to purchase the shares for $20 million that February. Shortly thereafter, HEBL issued Harold 32 common shares and $125,216 in exchange for ownership of his 350,200 personally held MLGL shares and $125,000. Two more new common shares would be granted to Harold to repay the $911,000 debt HEBL owed him from his two transactions with the company. This gave Harold, who feared that Bill was positioning himself to take over the holding company, control of HEBL. Harold did not want his bickering children to inherit MLGL because he feared they would destroy it.

Though Ballard ran up significant amounts of personal debt during his ownership of MLGL, he made the company very profitable, so much so that MLG became known as the "Cashbox on Carlton Street", referring to the address of the arena. Upon Harold's death on April 11, 1990, most of his estate, which was worth less than $50 million, was left to charitable organizations. The executors of Harold's will were supermarket tycoon Steve Stavro, Giffin, and Donald Crump. In November 1990 Molson exercised their option on 19.9% of the company, paying $10,000 for 735,575 of HEBL's MLGL shares, which at the time were valued at $20 million. Due to restrictions against cross-ownership in the NHL, the company set up a trust to hold their stake, and the league instructed them to sell the shares within an "adequate amount of time." Shortly after the estate, which had limited income due to HEBL still owing Toronto-Dominion Bank $15.8 million on its loan to acquire Harold Jr's HEBL stock, missed a January 1991 deadline to repay its $20 million loan (including interest) from Molson, Stavro personally loaned the estate the funds to pay off the debt, and in exchange, he received an option to purchase the estate's HEBL shares before January 1996. Bill challenged the transaction, but it was approved by the court. In early 1991, Molson offered to buy the estate's shares for $40 each. In September 1991, Bill sold his HEBL stock to his father's estate for $21 million, giving it ownership of the entire company. Shortly thereafter it was announced that Stavro had reached a deal with Molson on an option to purchase their MLGL shares until April 1994 and for Molson to waive their option on the estate's shares.

Steve Stavro

Stavro founded MLG Ventures (MLGV) in March 1994 with partners Toronto—Dominion Bank and Ontario Teachers' Pension Plan.  MLG Holdings Ltd. (MLGH), of which Stavro owned 80% and TD Bank controlled the remaining 20%, held a 51% ownership stake in MLGV, with the remaining 49% owned by Teachers'.  The following month MLGV announced that they had reached an agreement to purchase the 60.3% of MLGL held by Harold's estate for $34 a share or $75 million total, valuing the company at $125 million. The estate still owned Stavro $23 million at the time.  Molson also sold its 19.9% of MLGL to MLGV in April 1994 for $25 million. Larry Tanenbaum's company Kilmer Sports purchased a 25% share of MLGH from Stavro in 1996 for a reported $21 million.

MLGV subsequently purchased all the remaining shares and took MLGL private in 1998, after acquiring more than the 90% of stock necessary to force objecting shareholders out, and MLGL and MLGV amalgamated.  The purchase was the subject of an Ontario Securities Commission (OSC) review, due to allegations that MLGV had engaged in insider trading by failing to disclose that broadcast revenue was expected to substantially increase, and a $50 million lawsuit from Bill Ballard, who claimed that Stavro and others devalued MLGL and withheld information relevant to the value of the company prior to the sale of his stock.  Ontario's Office of the Public Trustee, which was charged with representing the charities named by Harold's will as beneficiaries, argued that Stavro had a conflict of interest as both executor of the will and buyer and had not paid market value because there was no public bidding process for the shares.  Several minority owners, including Harry Ornest, who held 3.5% of the company, and Jim Devellano also objected to MLGV's attempts to take the company private without an auction.  Stavro and his partners in MLGV reached a settlement in 1996 to pay an additional $23.5 million plus interest to the charities as well as $2.5 million to the minority shareholders who had sued, clearing the way for them to become the majority owner of MLGL.  They also settled with the OSC in 1999 for $1.6 million, which included a fine and costs.  Teachers' invested $44.3 million and TD $9.75 million in the deal.

Following the merger, the ownership structure of the now defunct MLGV was retained by MLGL.  MLGH was the majority owner of MLGL, holding 51% of the company.  It in turn was controlled by Stavro (55%), with minority shareholders Tanenbaum (25%) and TD Capital Group (20%). The remaining 49% of MLGL was owned by Teachers'.  This tiered ownership structure gave Stavro effective control of MLGL with only a net 29% stake of the company.  Teachers' invested a further $50 million in the company in the form of a convertible bond in 1998 to finance the purchase of the Raptors and ACC and complete construction of the arena.

Ontario Teachers' Pension Plan
In 2003 an agreement was reached to restructure the company with Stavro selling his stake to Bell Globemedia for a reported $120–150-million after debt repayments, the other partners converting their debts into equity, and each partner getting a direct ownership stake in the newly renamed MLSE, with MLGH being dissolved. This left Teachers' as the controlling majority owners of MLSE with 58.4%, and minority partners Bell Globemedia (15.4%), TD Capital with (13.5%) and Tanenbaum, who took over as non-executive chairman, with 13%.  Each owner of MLSE had a right of first refusal on any shares sold, in proportion to their ownership share.  The same year MLSE was internally valued at over $1 billion by Teachers' in its annual report.  In 2008 the Toronto Star reported that a valuation commissioned by the company concluded that the company was worth US$1.5 billion.  On December 5, 2008 CTVglobemedia (the renamed Bell Globemedia) sold half of its 15.4% stake to Tanenbaum for $100 million, making Tanenbaum the second-largest stakeholder with 20.7%.  The transaction valued the company at $1.2 billion.  On August 20, 2009 Teachers' announced that it had agreed to purchase the remaining 7.7% stake in MLSE owned by CTVglobemedia, bumping their stake to 66%.

Bell and Rogers
In December 2010 it was reported that Rogers Communications, owner of the Toronto Blue Jays, was in negotiations to purchase the Teachers' 66% stake in MLSE, with the asking price set at $1.3 billion, and in March 2011 Teachers' confirmed that their share in the company was up for sale.  Tanenbaum's right of first refusal on the shares gave him control over any sale by Teachers'. In May 2011 Teachers' announced that they had reached an agreement to purchase TD Capital's 13.5% ownership share, giving them 79.5% of the company and leaving Tanenbaum as the only minority partner with 20.5%, simplifying a sale of their shares.

In November 2011 Teachers' announced that they were taking the company off the market. However, only a couple of weeks later, on December 9, 2011, Teachers' announced the sale of its entire stake in MLSE to a partnership between BCE Inc. and Rogers Communications, in a deal valued at $1.32 billion, giving the company an equity value of $1.66 billion and an enterprise value of $2 billion due to the assumption of their share of MLSE's $372 million in debt and $66 million in leases.  As part of the deal, Tanenbaum increased his stake in the company by 5%, valued at $109 million, to 25% to secure his approval. The deal required the approval of Canada's Competition Bureau, the Canadian Radio-television and Telecommunications Commission (with regards to MLSE's TV channels), as well as the NHL, the AHL, the NBA, and MLS (with regards to each of MLSE's main sports franchises).

The Competition Bureau announced in May 2012 that it would not challenge the transaction, but that it will "actively review" the situation in light of "serious concerns" expressed by various parties, reserving the right to take action at a later date. The NHL Board of Governors approved the sale at a meeting in Las Vegas on June 19, 2012. The final approval, that of the CRTC, was granted on August 16, with the commission noting that it only had jurisdiction over the TV channels owned by MLSE (the transfer of ownership from MLSE to Bell, Rogers and Kilmer directly, it decided, posed no major concerns), and not the broadcast rights associated with MLSE's teams. The transaction closed on August 22, 2012.

As part of the sale, two numbered companies were created to jointly hold stock.  Following the restructuring, the ownership hierarchy of MLSE was:
 8047286 Canada Inc. (Rogers/Bell joint holding company) – 75%
 Rogers Communications – 50% (net ownership 37.5%)
 7680147 Canada Inc. (Bell holding company) – 50%
 BCE Inc. – 74.67% (net ownership 28%)
 BCE Master Trust Fund (investment fund of Bell's pension plan) – 25.33% (net ownership 9.5%)
 Kilmer Sports (holding company of Larry Tanenbaum) – 25%

This ownership structure ensures that, at the shareholder level, Rogers and Bell vote their overall 75% interest in the company together and thus decisions on the management of the company must be made by consensus of the two. (If Rogers and Bell owned their interests directly, either Rogers or Bell could be overruled by its competitor in combination with Tanenbaum.) As such, Rogers and Bell have agreed that their previously four of six (now six of eight) directors on the MLSE board will always vote together, and thus that any disagreements between the two companies will be settled privately without the involvement of Tanenbaum.  Bell has indicated that the involvement of Bell's pension fund is, at least in part, intended to ensure Bell can retain its existing 18% interest in the Montreal Canadiens, as NHL rules prevent any shareholder that owns more than 30% of a team from holding an ownership position in any other team. As a result of Bell and Rogers having co-ownership in MLSE, they agreed to split the regional broadcasts of Maple Leafs and Toronto FC games between Bell's TSN and Rogers' Sportsnet; the national rights to the Raptors and the NBA overall were also split between TSN and Sportsnet.

In 2015 MLSE initiated a corporate restructuring, with the plan to transfer most of its assets to another holding company, named "Maple Leaf Sports & Entertainment Partnership" (MLSEP), which would be wholly owned, directly and indirectly, by MLSE.

Assets

Sports teams
 Toronto Maple Leafs (National Hockey League) – Valued at US$2.0 billion in 2022, 2nd in the NHL
 Toronto Marlies (American Hockey League)
 Toronto Raptors  (National Basketball Association) – Valued at US$3.1 billion in 2022, 11th in the NBA
 Raptors 905 (NBA G League)
 Raptors Uprising GC (NBA 2K League)
 Toronto FC (Major League Soccer) – Valued at US$690 million in 2022, 6th in MLS
 Toronto FC II (MLS Next Pro)
 Toronto FC III (MLS Next)
 Toronto FC eSports (eMLS Cup)
 Toronto Argonauts (Canadian Football League)

Note that the valuations are estimates done by Forbes, and are not based on numbers provided by MLSE. MLSE has refuted past valuations made by Forbes.

Facilities and properties

Owns
 Scotiabank Arena – a multi-purpose indoor arena in downtown Toronto home to the Maple Leafs and Raptors which was constructed at a cost of $265 million
 OVO Athletic Centre – practice facility for the Raptors
 Maple Leaf Square (37.5%) – a real estate development adjacent to the Scotiabank Arena, developed in partnership with fellow OTPP subsidiary Cadillac Fairview, which includes, among other tenants, the following businesses operated by MLSE:
 Real Sports Bar & Grill – a sports-themed restaurant
 Real Sports Apparel – a sports clothing store
 e11even – an upscale restaurant on the corner of Bremner and York streets

Invested in and operates (owned by the City of Toronto)
 BMO Field – home of Toronto FC, the Argonauts and Canada men's national soccer team (CONCACAF)
 Coca-Cola Coliseum – home of the Marlies

Invested in
 Ford Performance Centre – practice facility for the Maple Leafs and Marlies
 BMO Training Ground – practice facility for Toronto FC, and home of Toronto FC II and the TFC Academy
 Lamport Stadium – former home of Toronto FC II and the TFC Academy; practice facility for the Argonauts.

Television channels
 NBA TV Canada – a localized version of NBA TV, a US basketball specialty channel, which also devotes part of its schedule to specific coverage of the Raptors (valued at $21 million on behalf of the CRTC in 2012)

Former

Sports teams
Cincinnati Tigers - Central Hockey League team (1981–82)
Denver Invaders/Victoria Maple Leafs - Western Hockey League team (1963–67)
Hamilton Tiger-Cats - Canadian Football League team (1978-1989)
Rochester Americans - American Hockey League team (1956–66)
Toronto Maple Leafs - International Lacrosse League team (1932)
Toronto Maple Leafs - National Lacrosse Association team (1968-68)
Toronto Marlboros - Ontario Hockey Association/Ontario Hockey League junior ice hockey team (1927-1988)
Tulsa Oilers/Oklahoma City Blazers -Central Professional Hockey League/Central Hockey League team (1964–76)

Facilities

Owned
Maple Leaf Gardens - arena used by the Maple Leafs, Raptors, Marlboros (1931-2004)

Operated
General Motors Centre - arena in Oshawa, Ontario (2006–08)

Television channels
GoalTV Canada - a localized version of GolTV, a US soccer specialty channel, which focused on Toronto FC (2009–15)
Leafs Nation Network - a specialty channel devoted to the Maple Leafs and Marlies (2001–22)

Staff

Board of directors
 Larry Tanenbaum – Kilmer Sports (non-executive chairman of the board)
 George A. Cope – BCE and Bell Canada
 Dale Lastman – Goodmans LLP
 Guy Laurence – Rogers Communications
 Edward Rogers III – Rogers Communications
 Anthony Staffieri – Rogers Communications
 Bernard Le Duc – Bell Canada
 Siim Vanaselja – Bell Canada

Executive team
 Cynthia Devine – Acting President and CEO 
 Nick Eaves - Chief Venue and Operations Officer
 Shannon Hosford - Chief Marketing Officer
 Teri Dennis-Davies - Chief People and Inclusion Officer
 Peter Miller - Chief Legal Officer
 Humza Tehrany - Chief Technology and Digital Officer
 Brendan Shanahan – president and alternate governor, Toronto Maple Leafs
 Masai Ujiri – president, Toronto Raptors
 Bill Manning – president, Toronto FC and Toronto Argonauts

References

Bibliography
 

 
Entertainment companies of Canada
Sports management companies
Sports holding companies
Television broadcasting companies of Canada
Major League Soccer owners
National Basketball Association owners
National Hockey League owners
Toronto Argonauts owners
Companies based in Toronto
Entertainment companies established in 1931
1931 establishments in Ontario
Privately held companies of Canada
Bell Canada
Rogers Communications
Canadian companies established in 1931
Sports companies of Canada